Nawaz Ahmed (born 10 December 1986) is a Pakistani first-class cricketer who plays for Peshawar cricket team.

References

External links
 

1986 births
Living people
Pakistani cricketers
Peshawar cricketers
Cricketers from Peshawar